Judge Nickerson may refer to:

Eugene Nickerson (1918–2002), judge of the United States District Court for the Eastern District of New York
William M. Nickerson (born 1933), judge of the United States District Court for the District of Maryland